The figure skating competition at the 1990 Goodwill Games was held in Seattle, USA between July 20 and August 5, 1990. Medals were awarded in the disciplines of men's singles, ladies' singles, pair skating, and ice dancing.

Results

Men

Ladies

Pairs

Ice dancing

References

External links
 Results
 1990 Goodwill Games

1990 in figure skating
International figure skating competitions hosted by the United States
1990 Goodwill Games
1990